The 2013 Toledo Rockets football team represented the University of Toledo in the 2013 NCAA Division I FBS football season. They were led by head coach Matt Campbell in his second full year after coaching the Rockets in the 2011 Military Bowl. They played their home games at the Glass Bowl and are members of the West Division of the Mid-American Conference. they finished the season 7–5, 5–3 in MAC play to finish in a tie for third place in the West Division. Despite being bowl eligible, they were not invited to a bowl game.

Schedule

Game summaries

Florida

Sources:

Missouri

Sources:

Eastern Washington

Sources:

Central Michigan

Sources:

Ball State

Sources:

Western Michigan

Sources:

Navy

Sources:

Bowling Green

Sources:

Eastern Michigan

Sources:

Buffalo

Sources:

Northern Illinois

Sources:

Akron

Sources:

References

Toledo
Toledo Rockets football seasons
Toledo Rockets football